Pantomallus is a genus of beetles in the family Cerambycidae, containing the following species:

 Pantomallus costulatus (Bates, 1870)
 Pantomallus martinezi Martins & Galileo, 2002
 Pantomallus morosus (Audinet-Serville, 1834)
 Pantomallus pallidus Aurivillius, 1923
 Pantomallus piruatinga Martins, 1997
 Pantomallus proletarius (Erichson, 1847)
 Pantomallus reclusus (Martins, 1981)
 Pantomallus rugosus Martins & Galileo, 2005
 Pantomallus titinga Martins & Galileo, 2005
 Pantomallus tristis Blanchard in Orbigny, 1847

References

Eburiini